The United States Air Force's 394th Strategic Missile Squadron was an intercontinental ballistic missile that operated the LGM-30 Minuteman and LGM-25C Titan II missiles at Vandenberg Air Force Base, California.

History
The squadron was first activated in 1958 and assigned to the 704th Strategic Missile Wing at Vandenberg Air Force Base as a training unit for intercontinental ballistic missiles.  In December of that year, the squadron and the 392d Missile Training Squadron, which was the training unit at Vandenberg for intermediate range ballistic missiles, were inactivated and replaced by a single training squadron, the 576th Strategic Missile Squadron.

The squadron was activated again in 1960 as the training unit for Minuteman missiles.  The squadron supported all LGM-30 Minuteman test launches.  When the 30th Space Wing became the single wing at Vandenberg under the Objective Wing organization, the squadron was transferred to the 30th and inactivated.

Lineage
 Constituted c. 6 March 1958 as the 394th Missile Training Squadron (ICBM)
 Activated on 1 April 1958
 Inactivated 15 December 1958
 Redesignated 394th Missile Training Squadron (ICBM-Minuteman) on 1 July 1960
 Redesignated 394th Strategic Missile Squadron on 1 February 1964
 Redesignated 394th ICBM Test Maintenance Squadron on 8 July 1976
 Redesignated 394th Maintenance Support Squadron on 1 September 1991
 Inactivated c. 1 July 1993

Assignments
 704th Strategic Missile Wing: 1 April 1958 – 15 December 1958 (attached to 1st Missile Division)
 1st Missile Division: 1 July 1960
 392d Strategic Missile Wing: 1 October 1961
 1st Strategic Air Division (later Strategic Missile Center): 1 December 1961
 310th Maintenance Group: 1 September 1991
 30th Logistics Group 1 July 1993 – c. 1 July 1993

Stations
 Vandenberg Air Force Base, 1 July 1958 – 15 December 1958
 Vandenberg Air Force Base, 1 April 1960 –  c. 1 July 1993

Missiles
 SM-65 Atlas (1958)
 LGM-30 Minuteman I (1960–unknown)
 LGM-25 Titan II (unknown)

Decorations

Notes

References 

 
 AF Pamphlet 900-2, Unit Decorations, Awards and Campaign Participation Credits Department of the Air Force, Washington, DC, 15 June 1971
 AF Pamphlet 900-2, Unit Decorations, Awards and Campaign Participation Credits, Vol II Department of the Air Force, Washington, DC, 30 September 1976

394
Military units and formations disestablished in 1993